The 2018–19 Swiss Basketball League (SBL) season is the 88th season of the top tier basketball league in Switzerland.

Fribourg Olympic defended successfully their league and conquered their 18th league.

Competition format
All teams will play two times against each other for completing 20 games per team.

The six first qualified teams will join the group for places 1 to 6 while the other six teams will play the group for places 7 to 11. These two groups will be played with a one-legged round-robin format, where all teams from group 1 to 6 and the two first qualified teams from the group for the seventh position will be qualified for the playoffs. In this intermediate stage, teams start with the points accumulated by the winnings achieved in the first stage.

The quarterfinals and the semifinals will be played as a best-of-five series while the final in a best-of-seven series.

Teams 

Winterthur was relegated to the NLB after finishing the previous season in the last position. Monthey-Chablais achieved the licence A in second instance after being firstly rejected.

Regular season

League table

Results

Group 1–6

League table

Results

Group 7–11

League table

Results

Playoffs
Seeded teams played at home games 1, 2 and 5.

Bracket

Quarter-finals

|}

Semi-finals

|}

Finals

|}

Swiss clubs in European competitions

References

External links 
 

Championnat LNA seasons
Swiss
basketball
basketball